The 2015–16 winter transfer window for Albanian football transfers opened on 1 January and closes on 1 February. Additionally, players without a club may join at any time, clubs may sign players on loan at any time, and clubs may sign a goalkeeper on an emergency loan if they have no registered goalkeeper available. This list includes transfers featuring only Albanian Superliga clubs which were completed after the end of the summer 2015 transfer window and before the end of the 2015–16 winter window. The transfer window is open for all clubs, whereas when the transfer window closes, no transfers can take place. 1 February 2016 is the transfer deadline day.

Superliga

Bylis Ballsh

In:

Out:

Flamurtari Vlorë

In:

Out:

Kukësi

In:

Out:

Laçi

In:

Out:

Partizani Tirana

In:

Out:

Skënderbeu Korçë

In:

 
 

Out:

Teuta Durrës

In:

Out:

Tirana

In:

 

Out:

Tërbuni Pukë

In:

Out:

Vllaznia Shkodër

In:

Out:

References

External links
 Footballdatabase.eu

Trans
Albanian
2015–16